The 1951 college football season finished with seven unbeaten major college teams, of which five were unbeaten and untied. Ultimately, the Tennessee Volunteers were voted the best team by the Associated Press, followed by the Michigan State Spartans, with the Vols having a plurality of first place votes (139 to 104). Tennessee lost in the Sugar Bowl to the equally undefeated and untied No. 3 Maryland Terrapins, but the postseason games were not taken into account by the major polls. Tennessee, Michigan State, and Illinois all claim national championships for 1951.

During the 20th century, the NCAA had no playoff for the college football teams that would later be described as "Division I-A". The NCAA did recognize a national champion based upon the final results of "wire service" (AP and UPI) polls. The extent of that recognition came in the form of acknowledgment in the annual NCAA Football Guide of the "unofficial" national champions The AP Poll in 1951 consisted of the votes of as many as 307 sportswriters.

Though not all writers voted in every poll, each would give their opinion of the ten best teams. Under a point system of 10 points for first place, 9 for second, etc., the "overall" ranking was determined. Although the rankings were based on the collective opinion of the representative sportswriters, the teams that remained "unbeaten and untied" were generally ranked higher than those that had not. A defeat, even against a strong opponent, tended to cause a team to drop in the rankings, and a team with two or more defeats was unlikely to remain in the Top 20 Generally, the top teams played on New Year's Day in the four major postseason bowl games: the Rose Bowl (near Los Angeles at Pasadena), the Sugar Bowl (New Orleans), the Orange Bowl (Miami), and the Cotton Bowl (Dallas).

Conference and program changes

Conference changes
Three conferences began play during the 1951 season:
Central Church College Conference – active through the 1957 season
Indiana Collegiate Conference - active through the 1977 season
Pennsylvania State Athletic Conference – an active NAIA/NCAA Division II conference

Membership changes

September
In the preseason poll released on September 24, 1951, Tennessee and Michigan State were ranked first and second, with Tennessee having 60 of the 115 first place votes.  MSU had opened its season on the 22nd with a 6–0 win over Oregon State.   They were followed by No. 3 Ohio State, defending champion No. 4 Oklahoma, and No. 5 California (which had won its opener against Santa Clara, 34–0).  As the regular season progressed, a new poll would be issued on the Monday following the weekend's games.

On September 14, the Central Missouri Jules played the Southwestern Moundbuilders in the rejected touchdown game where Southwestern's head coach Harold Hunt "rejected" a touchdown awarded by officials because his player stepped out of bounds.

On September 29  No. 1 Tennessee beat Mississippi State 14–0.  No. 2 Michigan State won at No. 17 Michigan, 25–0, to take the top spot from the Vols.  No. 3 Ohio State beat visiting SMU 7–0 in a win not deemed good enough to stay in the top five.  No. 4 Oklahoma beat William & Mary 49–7.  No. 5 California won in Philadelphia against No. 19 Penn, 35–0, and rose to second in the next poll.  The game was broadcast in New York in a test for color television   No. 14 Notre Dame, which had beaten Indiana 48–6, rose to fifth.  The poll: No. 1 Michigan State, No. 2 California, No. 3 Tennessee, No. 4 Oklahoma, and No. 5 Notre Dame.

October
October 6 No. 1 Michigan State won at No. 7 Ohio State, 24–20.  No. 2 California beat Minnesota, 55–14.  No. 3 Tennessee beat No. 16 Duke 26–0.  No. 4 Oklahoma lost at No. 10 Texas A&M, 14–7 and fell out of the top five.  No. 5 Notre Dame had beaten Mercy College of Detroit, 40–6, the night before.  The next poll: No. 1 Michigan State, No. 2 California, No. 3 Tennessee, No. 4 Texas A&M, and No. 5 Notre Dame.

October 13  No. 1 Michigan State had trouble in defeating Marquette 20–14.  No. 2 California beat Washington State 42–35 and took over the top spot from the Spartans in the next poll.  No. 3 Tennessee beat the University of Chattanooga 42–13.  No. 4 Texas A&M beat Trinity College 53–14 and fell from the top five.  No. 5 Notre Dame lost to visiting SMU, 27–20.  Taking the places of the Aggies and the Irish were No. 6 Texas (which had beaten No. 11 Oklahoma in Dallas, 9–7) and No. 8 Georgia Tech (which had beaten LSU 25–7).  The next poll: No. 1 California, No. 2 Tennessee, No. 3 Michigan State, No. 4 Texas, and No. 5 Georgia Tech.

October 20 In Los Angeles, No. 1 California and No. 11 USC, both unbeaten at 4–0–0, faced off, and the Golden Bears lost the game, along with the top spot in the poll, 21–14.  Earlier, in Birmingham, No. 2 Tennessee defeated Alabama 27–13.  No. 3 Michigan State won at Penn State, 32–21.  No. 4 Texas lost at Arkansas, 16–14.  No. 5 Georgia Tech defeated Auburn 27–7.  Appearing in the top five were No. 8 Illinois (which had a 27–20 win over No. 20 Washington) and No. 7 Maryland (which had beaten North Carolina 14–7).  The next poll: No. 1 Tennessee, No. 2 Michigan State, No. 3 Georgia Tech, No. 4 Illinois, and No. 5 Maryland.

Another significant game on this date, though for a far different reason, was the Drake–Oklahoma A&M matchup. Then-unbeaten Drake was led by quarterback Johnny Bright, who was leading the nation in total offense at the time and had been touted as a Heisman Trophy candidate. Two years earlier, he had been the first black player to appear in a game at A&M's home field, without incident. The same could not be said about this game. Bright was forced to leave the game in the first quarter after suffering three concussions and a broken jaw as the result of a racially motivated attack by white A&M player Wilbanks Smith, and A&M ultimately won 27–14. The attack was immortalized in a photo sequence in the Des Moines Register that won the photographers a Pulitzer Prize. It also had an enduring legacy on the sport:
 By the end of the school year, Drake and Bradley withdrew from the Missouri Valley Conference in protest over both the attack and the failure of either the conference or Oklahoma A&M to discipline Smith. Bradley would return to the MVC for non-football sports in 1955, with Drake doing the same a year later, but Bradley never returned for football (dropping the sport in 1970) and Drake did not return to MVC football until 1971.
 The attack led to new NCAA rules regarding illegal blocking and mandating the use of helmets with face guards.

October 27  No. 1 Tennessee beat Tennessee Tech 68–0.  No. 2 Michigan State beat visiting Pitt, 53–26.  No. 3 Georgia Tech won narrowly at Vanderbilt, 8–7.  No. 4 Illinois won at Indiana, 21–0.  Unbeaten (4–0–0) and No. 5 Maryland visited once-beaten (4–1–0) LSU, and won convincingly, 27–0.  With the top five teams staying unbeaten, the poll changed only slightly:  No. 1 Tennessee, No. 2 Michigan State, No. 3 Illinois, No 4 Maryland, and No. 5 Georgia Tech.

November
November 3 No. 1 Tennessee won at North Carolina, 27–0 for its fourth shutout.  In six games, the Vols had outscored their opponents, 207–14.  No. 2 Michigan State was idle and dropped to fifth in the next poll.  No. 3 Illinois beat No. 15 Michigan 7–0.  No. 4 Maryland shut out Missouri 35–0.  No. 5 Georgia Tech was tied by Duke, 14–14.  No. 6 Princeton, which rose to 5–0–0 after a 12–0 win over Brown and had not lost a game in more than two years, gave an Ivy League addition to the Top Five.  The next poll: No. 1 Tennessee, No. 2 Illinois, No. 3 Maryland, No. 4 Princeton, and No. 5 Michigan State.

November 10 No. 1 Tennessee beat Washington & Lee, 60–14.  No. 2 Illinois beat Iowa 40–13.  In Baltimore, No. 3 Maryland beat Navy, 40–21.  No. 4 Princeton won at Harvard, 54–13 but left the top five.  No. 5 Michigan State (6–0–0) hosted No. 11 Notre Dame (5–1–0), shut out the Irish 35–0, and returned to the No. 1 spot in the poll.  In Los Angeles, two unbeaten and untied (7–0–0) powers faced off, as No. 6 USC and No. 7 Stanford met.  The Stanford Indians beat the Trojans 27–20.  The next poll: No. 1 Michigan State, No. 2 Tennessee, No. 3 Illinois, No. 4 Stanford, and No. 5 Maryland.

November 17  No. 1 Michigan State won at Indiana, 30–26.  No. 2 Tennessee won at Mississippi, 46–21. No. 3 Illinois got a blemish on its record with a 0–0 tie at Ohio State.  No. 4 Stanford beat Oregon State 35–14.  No. 5 Maryland overwhelmed N.C. State 53–0.  No. 6 Princeton, which had shut out Yale 27–0, came back to the top five.  The next poll: No. 1 Tennessee, No. 2 Michigan State, No. 3 Stanford, No. 4 Maryland, and No. 5 Princeton.

November 24 
No. 1 Tennessee beat No. 9 Kentucky 28–0.  No. 2 Michigan State beat Colorado 45–7 to finish its season at 9–0–0.  No. 3 Stanford suffered its first defeat, falling to No. 19 California 20–7.  No. 4 Maryland stayed unbeaten, defeating West Virginia 54–7.  No. 5 Princeton closed its season with a 13–0 win over Dartmouth.  No. 6 Illinois, which won at Northwestern 3–0, returned to the top five.  The penultimate poll: No. 1 Tennessee, No. 2 Michigan State, No. 3 Maryland, No. 4 Illinois, and No. 5 Princeton.

On December 1 No. 1 Tennessee closed its season unbeaten with a 35–27 win over Vanderbilt. No. 6 Georgia Tech, the only other highly-ranked team which had not finished its season, defeated Georgia 48–6. This result moved the Yellow Jackets up a spot in the final poll: No. 1 Tennessee, No. 2 Michigan State, No. 3 Maryland, No. 4 Illinois, No. 5 Georgia Tech, and No. 6 Princeton, with all six teams being undefeated (although Illinois and Georgia Tech both had ties on their record).

The nation's seventh undefeated team was the No. 14 University of San Francisco Dons, who closed their season—and their football program—with a perfect record of 9 wins, 0 losses and 0 ties.  After their November 24 game against in-state Jesuit rival Loyola University, a 20–2 win, USF stopped playing football.

Conference standings

Major conference standings

Independents

Minor conferences

Minor conference standings

Rankings

Bowl games
All seven games played were on Tuesday, January 1, 1952.

Heisman Trophy voting
The Heisman Trophy is given to the year's most outstanding player

Source:

See also
 1951 College Football All-America Team

References